Zillmere railway station is located on the North Coast line in Queensland, Australia. It serves the Brisbane suburb of Zillmere.

Services
Zillmere is served by all City network services from Kippa-Ring to Central, many continuing to Springfield Central

Services by platform

Transport links
Brisbane Transport operate six routes via Zillmere station:
330: Bracken Ridge to Cultural Centre busway station
P331: Bracken Ridge to George Street, Brisbane
P332: Zillmere to University of Queensland
N339: Fortitude Valley to Bracken Ridge – Saturdays and Sundays only
326: Bracken Ridge/Sandgate to Toombul
327: Strathpine/Bracken Ridge to Toombul

References

External links

Zillmere station Queensland Rail
Zillmere station Queensland's Railways on the Internet

Railway stations in Brisbane
North Coast railway line, Queensland